Hugh Gore DD (1613-1691) was a seventeenth century Anglican Bishop of Waterford and Lismore in Ireland who founded Swansea Grammar School.

He was born in Maiden Newton in Dorset, England in 1613. He want to school in Lismore, and studied at Trinity College, Oxford and at Trinity College, Dublin.

On becoming a priest he held livings in Nicholaston and Oxwich near Swansea, Wales. He was ejected from his livings in 1650 under the Propagation Act of the Commonwealth for delinquency and refusing the engagement, after which he kept a school in Swansea.

After the Restoration of King Charles II he returned to favour and became Dean of Lismore in 1664; and Bishop of Waterford and Lismore in 1666. He founded Swansea Grammar School in 1682, which is now named Bishop Gore School in his honour. He retired to Swansea in 1689. He died in 1691 and was buried at St Mary's Church, Swansea.

References

1613 births
People from Dorset
Alumni of Trinity College, Oxford
Alumni of Trinity College Dublin
Deans of Lismore
17th-century Anglican bishops in Ireland
Bishops of Waterford and Lismore (Church of Ireland)
1691 deaths